The Country Gentlemen featuring Ricky Skaggs is a compilation album by the progressive bluegrass band Country Gentlemen.

Track listing 

 Travelling Kind (Young) 3:28
 Souvenirs (Prine) 2:44
 Leaves That Are Green (Simon) 1:49
 Irish Spring (Skaggs) 3:15
 Home in Louisiana (Davis) 2:26
 City of New Orleans (Goodman) 3:02
 House of the Rising Sun (trad.) 3:26
 Catfish John (McDill, Reynolds) 2:31
 Heartaches (Hoffman, Klenner) 4:27
 One Morning in May (Keith, Rooney) 3:12
 Bringing Mary Home (Duffey, Kingston, Mank) 3:33
 Welcome to New York (Emerson, Lawson) 2:50

Personnel 
 Charlie Waller - guitar, vocals
 Doyle Lawson - mandolin, vocals
 Bill Emerson - banjo, vocals
 Bill Yates - bass, vocals
 Mike Auldridge - Dobro
 James Bailey -banjo
 Jerry Douglas - Dobro
 Ricky Skaggs - violin, vocals

References

External links 
 https://web.archive.org/web/20091215090142/http://www.lpdiscography.com/c/Cgentlemen/cgent.htm

Ricky Skaggs albums
The Country Gentlemen compilation albums
Collaborative albums
1987 compilation albums
Vanguard Records compilation albums